The Verse of Ikmal al-Din or the Verse of Ikmal is verse 5:3 of Islam's central religious text, the Quran, which includes the passage  

The interpretation of the Verse of Ikmal is disputed between the Sunni and Shia sects of Islam. Sunni authors offer different explanations, chief among them is that this verse was revealed to Muhammad during the Farewell Pilgrimage to signal the completion of the Islamic legislation. In contrast, Shia authors are nearly unanimous that the Verse of Ikmal was revealed after the Ghadir Khumm. In Shia sources, the perfection of Islam and the disappointment of the faithless signify Muhammad's designation of his cousin and son-in-law Ali to lead the nascent Muslim community after him. Some Sunni sources also associate the Verse of Ikmal with the Ghadir Khumm.

Background

Farewell Pilgrimage 
Shortly before his death in 632 CE, Muhammad performed the Hajj ritual in Mecca, which has become known as his Farewell Pilgrimage. In his sermon in Mecca (at Arafat) and again later at the Ghadir Khumm by some accounts, he alerted Muslims about his impending death. On his return trip to Medina after the Hajj, Muhammad called the Muslim caravan to a halt at the Ghadir Khumm ahead of the noon congregational prayer, before the pilgrims parted to go their separate ways.

Ghadir Khumm 
After the prayer, Muhammad gave a sermon in which he declared, "Anyone who has me as his mawla, has this Ali as his ," as reported by some canonical Sunni and Shia sources, such as Musnad Ibn Hanbal and al-Ghadir.

Interpretations 
While the authenticity of the Ghadir Khumm is rarely contested, its interpretation is a source of controversy between Sunni and Shia. In particular, the interpretation of the Arabic word  tends to be split along sectarian lines in the context of this hadith. Sunni authors argue that Muhammad did not explicitly refer to Ali as his successor in the sermon, while the Shia Amini enumerates the Sunni sources that corroborate the Shia interpretation in the eleven volumes of al-Ghadir.

Sunni view 
Sunni scholars proffer different views about when or why the Verse of Ikmal was revealed to Muhammad. The majority Sunni view is that Muhammad received this verse after his sermon at Arafat during the Farewell Pilgrimage in 632. This view is also noted by Nöldeke. Some other Sunni historians report that this verse was revealed first at the Farewell Pilgrimage and then repeated at the Ghadir Khumm. This group includes al-Tabari, al-Baghdadi, and Ibn al-Jawzi, according to Abbas. The Verse of Ikmal is instead linked to the 629/630 conquest of Mecca in Tafsir al-Qurtubi. In this vein, the perfection of Islam in the verse refers to the banishment of idolatry from the pilgrimage in some reports collected by al-Tabari and al-Zamakhshari. 

Some Sunni commentators view the perfection of Islam in this verse as a reference to the rites of Hajj which were established by Muhammad in his Farewell Pilgrimage. Yet for others, the Verse of Ikmal signifies the completion of revelation, though there are also other candidates for the last verse, namely, verses 2:281, 4:176, 9:128-9, 110:1-3. Al-Tabari and al-Zamakhshari claim that no ritual or legal ruling was revealed after the Verse of Ikmal, while al-Qurtubi asserts that Muhammad received some legal but no ritual injunctions after this verse. This last view that the perfection of religion in this verse corresponds to the completion of the Islamic legislation is common among the Sunni, though criticism of it is that some legal injunctions about riba were likely revealed after the Verse of Ikmal.

Shia view 
Shia sources are nearly unanimous that the Verse of Ikmal was revealed to Muhammad after his sermon at the Ghadir Khumm on the return trip from the Farewell Pilgrimage in 632. As reported by Sunni and Shia sources, Muhammad at the Ghadir Khumm announced, "For whomever I am his , Ali is [also] his ." Alternatively, this verse and Muhammad's announcement both took place during the Farewell Pilgrimage by a few Shia accounts. In Shia sources, the perfection of religion and the completion of blessing in the Verse of Ikmal refer to the establishment of the spiritual authority (wilaya) of Ali over Muslims.

Al-Mizan 
Tabatabai, the author of the seminal Shia exegesis al-Mizan, attempts to prove in his work that "today" in the Verse of Ikmal is the day of the Ghadir Khumm, as opposed to the conquest of Mecca or any other day. In particular, the unbelievers' despair in the Verse of Ikmal followed Muhammad's designation of Ali to guide the nascent Muslim community, he argues. The enemies of Islam despaired from destroying it, suggests Tabatabai, because Ali's leadership would have rightly guided the Muslim community.  

Tabatabai argues that the perfection of religion in the Verse of Ikmal is the guardianship of Ali, as opposed to the closure of the Islamic legislation advanced by some Sunni scholars. Mavani adds that the traditions cited by Tabatabai are mutawatir, that is, they have numerous, uninterrupted chains of transmissions. Tabatabai elsewhere challenges the Sunni view by arguing that the perfection of Islam in the Verse of Ikmal cannot refer to a minor occasion such as the promulgation of a religious injunction. 

He also argues that the perfection of religion in the Verse of Ikmal was the fulfillment of an earlier divine promise in verse 24:55, which reads,

For Tabatabai, the authority of the divine guides completes the spiritual authority of God and His prophet. Nevertheless, he adds, all this was conditional on the obedience of Muslims to the divine instructions at the Ghadir Khumm per verse 8:53 of the Quran, which includes the passage, "God would never change a favor He had conferred on a people unless they changed what was within themselves."

See also

References

Sources 

 

 
 
 
 
 
 
 
 
 
 
 

Quranic verses
Islamic ethics
Shia Islam
Sunni Islam
Sharia
Imamate